H92 may refer to:

Sikorsky S-92
, a G-class destroyer launched in 1935; sunk in 1940
, a R-class destroyer launched in 1942; de-commissioned in 1962